The Fastest Guitar Alive is a 1967 American musical comedy Western film, directed by Michael D. Moore with singer Roy Orbison in his only starring role as an actor.

The film features Orbison performing seven original songs, which appeared on his 1967 MGM album of the same name. His song "There Won't Be Many Coming Home" is featured in the 2015 western film The Hateful Eight.

Plot
Near the end of the American Civil War, a Southern spy (Orbison) with a bullet-shooting guitar is given the task of robbing gold bullion from the United States Mint in San Francisco to help finance the ill-fated Confederacy's last-ditch war effort.

Cast
 Roy Orbison as Johnny Banner
 Sammy Jackson as Steve Menlo
 Maggie Pierce as Flo Chesnut
 Joan Freeman as Sue Chesnut
 Lyle Bettger as Charlie
 John Doucette as Marshal Max Cooper
 Patricia Donahue as Stella DeWitt
 Ben Cooper as Deputy Rink
 Ben Lessy as Indian Chief
 Douglas Kennedy as Sheriff Joe Stedman
 Iron Eyes Cody as First Indian
 Sam the Sham as First Expressman

Production and release
Filming began September 1966. Although Orbison was pleased with the film, it proved to be a critical and box office flop. While MGM had included five films in his contract, no more were made.

Soundtrack

The Fastest Guitar Alive is the soundtrack for the 1967 film of the same name – and Orbison's eleventh studio album – released in June 1967 on MGM Records. It was the only album to consist entirely of Roy Orbison/Bill Dees originals. Its single "There Won't Be Many Coming Home" reached #18 in the UK and entered the Australian chart at its highest position of #32 before slipping down the chart.

Track listing
All songs written by Roy Orbison and Bill Dees.

The track "Rollin' On" was covered on the Prague Radio Dance Orchestra album Famous Western Film Melodies.

See also
 List of American films of 1967

References

External links
 
 
 The Fastest Guitar Alive Virtual Museum

1967 musical comedy films
1960s spy comedy films
1960s Western (genre) comedy films
1967 films
American musical comedy films
Films directed by Mickey Moore
Metro-Goldwyn-Mayer films
American Civil War spy films
1960s English-language films
1960s American films